Mark Anthony Winter (born ) is an editorial cartoonist from New Zealand who works under the pen-name Chicane.

His cartoons have been published in The Southland Times newspaper for more than 25 years, and are now published nationally via the stuff.co.nz website. His work also features in the PSA Journal (New Zealand Public Service Association).

In 2008, he won the cartoonist category in the Qantas Media Awards.

He was elected to the Invercargill City Council in 1983. In 1986, he was the highest-polling councillor and was thus made Deputy Mayor under Eve Poole until 1989. Following Poole's death in 1992, he ran in the resulting by-election and placed third. He again served as Deputy Mayor under David Harrington. He was a member of the Southland Regional Council until 2007.

References 

1950s births
Living people
New Zealand comics artists
New Zealand editorial cartoonists
Invercargill City Councillors
Deputy mayors of Invercargill
Invercargill Licensing Trust Board members
Southland regional councillors
Year of birth missing (living people)